Jamie Dever (born 30 January 1993) is an Irish professional rugby union player who plays as a prop.  Currently unattached he most recently played for London Irish in the Premiership Rugby. Dever made his debut for London Irish on 30 October 2021.

Dever previously played prop for Old Glory DC and the Houston Sabercats in Major League Rugby.

He also played for Connacht in the Pro14 competition and the Cambridge in the semi-professional National League 1 in England.

References

1993 births
Living people
Irish expatriate rugby union players
Irish expatriate sportspeople in the United States
Expatriate rugby union players in the United States
Sportspeople from County Mayo
Houston SaberCats players
People from Westport, County Mayo
Rugby union props
Irish rugby union players
Connacht Rugby players
San Diego Legion players
Old Glory DC players
London Irish players
Rugby union players from County Mayo